Parke Davis may refer to:

 Parke-Davis, the pharmaceutical company
 Parke H. Davis, an American football player, coach, and historian